Early modern history of Serbia refers to the history of Serbia during the Early Modern period, from the Ottoman conquest in the second half of 15th century up to the beginning of the Serbian Revolution in 1804. The era includes periods of Ottoman and Habsburg rule in various parts of Serbia. During that time, several Habsburg–Ottoman wars were fought on the territory of Serbia.

Between Habsburgs and Ottomans

Ottoman Serbia, designates periods of Ottoman rule in Serbia:
Sanjaks, which had parts of modern Serbia include: Bosnia, Smederevo, Kruševac, Niš, Novi Pazar, Syrmia, Prizren, Skopje, Vidin, Vučitrn.

Habsburg-occupied Serbia, designates three periods of Habsburg rule in various parts of Serbia:
Habsburg-occupied Serbia (1686–1691)
Kingdom of Serbia (1718–1739)
Habsburg-occupied Serbia (1788–1791)

 Habsburg rule in northern parts of Serbia (present day Vojvodina) in 18th century:
Banat of Temeswar
Syrmia County
Bács-Bodrog County

Habsburg–Ottoman wars fought on the territory of Serbia:
Habsburg–Ottoman War (1593–1606)
Habsburg–Ottoman War (1663–1664)
Habsburg–Ottoman War (1683–1699)
Habsburg–Ottoman War (1716–1718)
Habsburg–Ottoman War (1737–1739)
Habsburg–Ottoman War (1788–1791)

Major Serbian uprisings during early modern period:
Uprising in Banat (1594)
Serb uprising of 1596–97 (in Herzegovina)
Serb uprising of 1737–39 (in Raška)

Main Serbian ecclesiastical institutions during early modern period:
Serbian Patriarchate of Peć, renewed in 1557, abolished in 1766
Metropolitanate of Karlovci, created in 1708, for territories under Habsburg rule

The period is followed by the history of modern Serbia.

See also

 History of Serbia
 History of the Serbs

References

Sources

 
 
 
 
 
 
 
 
 
 
 
 
 
 
 
 
 
 
 
 
 
 
 
 

Early Modern history of Serbia